The following lists events that happened during 2006 in the Republic of Albania.

Incumbents
 President: Alfred Moisiu 
 Prime Minister: Sali Berisha

Events

April
 Parliament imposes a ban on speedboats in coastal waters in a bid to crack down on people and drug smuggling.

June
 Stabilisation and Association agreement signed with EU.

Deaths
 3 February - Vath Koreshi, Albanian writer and screenwriter
 7 February - Ibrahim Kodra, Albanian painter
 8 July - Pjetër Arbnori, Albanian politician, gulag survivor, "the Mandela of the Balkans"

See also
 2006 in Albanian television

References

 
2000s in Albania
Years of the 21st century in Albania